Vardåsen is a village in Asker, Akershus, Norway. 
Vardåsen is located in Asker municipality in Akershus county in eastern Norway.

Villages in Akershus